Lauren Katie Bell (born 2 January 2001) is an English cricketer who plays for Berkshire, Southern Vipers, Southern Brave and UP Warriorz. She has previously played for Middlesex in the Women's Twenty20 Cup. Bell made her international debut for the England women's cricket team in June 2022.

Personal and early life
Until the age of 16, Bell played football for Reading FC's Academy.

Bell is nicknamed The Shard because of her height. Her sister Colette has played for Berkshire and Buckinghamshire.

Domestic career
Bell has played for Hungerford Cricket Club, and was the first girl to play for the Bradfield College 1st XI. In 2015, at the age of 14, Bell made her Women's County Championship debut for Berkshire. She made eight appearances in the 2015 season, taking seven wickets. In 2019, Berkshire loaned Bell to Middlesex for the Twenty20 Cup.

In 2018, Bell made her debut for the Southern Vipers in the Women's Cricket Super League. She played for the Vipers in the 2019 Women's Cricket Super League final, where they lost to Western Storm. In 2020, she was included in the Vipers squad for the Rachael Heyhoe Flint Trophy. In December 2020, Bell was one of 41 women's cricketers given a full-time domestic cricket contract.

Bell was signed for Southern Brave for The Hundred; the 2020 season was cancelled due to the COVID-19 pandemic, and Bell was retained by the Brave for the 2021 season. In April 2022, she was bought by Southern Brave for the 2022 season of The Hundred.

Bell signed for the UP Warriorz for the inaugural season of the Women's Premier League.

International career
In 2019, Bell played for the England women's Academy against Australia A. She was given an academy contract for the 2019–20 season. In 2020, she was one of the 24 women chosen by England to begin training during the COVID-19 pandemic. Bell was one of three uncapped players in the training squad; the others were Emma Lamb and Issy Wong.

In December 2021, Bell was named in England's A squad for their tour to Australia, with the matches being played alongside the Women's Ashes. In January 2022, during the tour, she was added to the full England squad for the one-off Test match. In February 2022, she was named as one of two reserve players in England's team for the 2022 Women's Cricket World Cup in New Zealand.

In June 2022, Bell was named in England's Women's Test squad for their one-off match against South Africa. She made her Test debut on 27 June 2022, for England against South Africa. On 2 July 2022, Bell was also named in England's Women's One Day International (WODI) squad for their matches against South Africa. She made her WODI debut on 15 July 2022, also for England against South Africa. In November 2022, Bell was awarded with her first England central contract.

References

External links
 
 

2001 births
Living people
England women Test cricketers
England women One Day International cricketers
England women Twenty20 International cricketers
Sportspeople from Swindon
Berkshire women cricketers
Middlesex women cricketers
Southern Vipers cricketers
Southern Brave cricketers
UP Warriorz cricketers